Kheyrabad (also Romanized as Kheyrābād) is a village in Salehabad Rural District, Salehabad County, Razavi Khorasan Province, Iran. At the 2006 census, its population was 163, in 28 families.

References 

Populated places in   Torbat-e Jam County